Maple Hill is an unincorporated community located in Pender County, North Carolina. Maple Hill also extends into Onslow County, North Carolina. The name of the community can be traced to a  maple tree or maple grove which was formerly located on a hill in the area. The population of Maple Hill is roughly 2,500.

Geography
Its elevation is 33 feet.

Postal information
The United States Postal Service ZIP Code for Maple Hill is 28454.

References 

Unincorporated communities in Pender County, North Carolina
Unincorporated communities in North Carolina